The United States Secretary of the Treasury is the head of the United States Department of the Treasury, and is the chief financial officer of the federal government of the United States. The Secretary of the Treasury serves as the principal advisor to the president of the United States on all matters pertaining to economic and fiscal policy. The Secretary is, by custom, a member of the Cabinet of the United States and, by law, a member of the National Security Council.

Under the Appointments Clause of the United States Constitution, the officeholder is nominated by the president of the United States, and, following a confirmation hearing before the Senate Committee on Finance, is confirmed by the United States Senate.

The Secretary of State, the Secretary of the Treasury, the Secretary of Defense, and the Attorney General are generally regarded as the four most important Cabinet officials, due to the size and importance of their respective departments.

The current Secretary of the Treasury is Janet Yellen, who is the first woman to hold the office.

Powers and functions

The Secretary along with the Treasurer of the United States must sign Federal Reserve notes before they can become legal tender. The Secretary also manages the United States Emergency Economic Stabilization fund.

Salary
The Secretary of the Treasury is a Level I position in the Executive Schedule, thus earning the salary prescribed for that level (US$221,400, as of January 2021).

List of secretaries of the treasury

 Parties
 (4)
 (4)
 (30)
 (5)
 (34)
 (1)

Status

Succession

Presidential succession
The Secretary of the Treasury is fifth in the presidential line of succession, following the Secretary of State and preceding the Secretary of Defense.

Succession within the Department
On August 16, 2016, President Barack Obama signed Executive Order 13735, which changed the order of succession for filling the Treasury Secretary's role when necessary. At any time when the Secretary and the Deputy Secretary of the Treasury have both died, resigned, or cannot serve as Secretary for other reasons, the order designates which Treasury officers are next in line to serve as Acting Secretary. 

The order of succession is:

Notes

References

External links

 
 

|-

Treasury
Treasury, Secretary of the
Secretary
 
1789 establishments in the United States